Tatars are a Turkic ethnic group numbering 6.7 million in the late 20th century, including all subgroups of Tatars, such as Volga Tatars, Lipka Tatars, Crimean Tatars, and Siberian Tatars. Russia is home to the majority of ethnic Tatars, with a population of around 5,500,000. Uzbekistan, Kazakhstan, Ukraine, Kyrgyzstan, Tajikistan, Turkmenistan, and Azerbaijan also each have populations greater than 30,000.

Artists
 Aisa Hakimcan - poet, musician, director (Finnish Tatar) 
 Dajan Ahmet - actor, director (Estonian Tatar) 
 Minsalim Timergazeev – sculptor
 Aleksandr Bashirov – actor (Siberian Tatar mother)
 Vadim Abdrashitov – film director (Volga Tatar father)
 Talgat Nigmatulin – movie actor
 Chulpan Khamatova – actress
 Renata Litvinova – TV celebrity (Volga Tatar father)
 Charles Bronson – American actor (Lipka Tatar father)
 Rinat Baibekov – artist
 Marat Basharov – movie actor, TV show actor
  – artist, choreographer, ballet dancer
 Sergey Shakurov – actor
 Valentina Talyzina – film and stage actress(Russified Tatar father)
 Vasily Vereshchagin (Tatar ancestry)

Businessmen
 Rinat Akhmetov – billionaire, Ukraine's richest citizen, leader of the Donetsk business group
 Rustam Tariko –  billionaire
 Akhat Bragin – businessman and mentor of Renat Akhmetov, former owner of FC Shakhtar Donetsk

Dancers
 Galiya Izmaylova – ballerina
 Ilshat Shabaev – Russian dancer
 Rudolf Nureyev – Soviet ballet dancer and choreographer.
 Diana Vishneva – ballerina (Volga Tatar mother)

Media
 Lilia Gildeeva – journalist, newscaster with NTV
Igor and Grichka Bogdanoff – television presenters, producers
Maxim Sharafutdinov
Rosa Syabitova

Models
 Elmira Abdrazakova – Kazakhstani-Russian model and Miss Russia 2013 (Volga Tatar father)
 Diana Galimullina – Russian fashion model

Musicians
 Sara Sadiqova – composer
 Alfiya Avzalova – singer
 Dima Bilan – singer (Volga Tatar ancestry)
 Aida Garifullina
 Dina Garipova – pop singer
 Rustem Hayroudinoff – pianist
 Farit Yarullin – composer, author of the music to the first Tatar ballet: Şüräle
 Zemfira – rock singer
 Eldar Djangirov – jazz pianist (Volga Tatar father)
 Halida Dinova – pianist
 Nacip Cihanov – composer
 Rustem Yakhin – composer
 Alina Ibragimova
 Airat Ichmouratov – composer, conductor, clarinetist 
 Salih Saidashev – composer
 Irina Smelaya
 Timati – rapper, pop singer (Volga Tatar father)
 Alsou – pop singer (Volga Tatar mother)
 Sofia Gubaidulina – composer (Volga Tatar father)
 Jamala – singer, composer, winner of the Eurovision Song Contest 2016 (Crimean Tatar father)
 Räşit Wahapov – singer
 Zulya Kamalova

Noble families
 Birkin family
 Cantemirești
 Chelishchev family
 House of Izmaylov
 Kochubey family
 House of Siberia
 Meshchersky
 Naryshkin family
 Sheremetev
 Somov
 Urusov
 Verderevsky
 Yaushev family
 Yenikeyev
 House of Yusupov
 Карамзины
 татариновы
 ушаковы
 Лихарев
 Семеновы
 сабуров
 Годуновы

Leaders
 Simeon Bekbulatovich 
 Sayed Borhan  
 Elena Glinskaya (Lipka Tatar father)
 Boris Godunov
 Dmitry Petrovich Maksutov – Tatar noble family Maksutov 
 Yadegar Mokhammad of Kazan 
 Utameshgaray of Kazan
 Natalya Naryshkina

Military personnel 

 Raushan Abdullin, reconnaissance engineer, participated in the Russo–Georgian War, was posthumously awarded the Hero of the Russian Federation for bravery
 Asaf Abdrakhmanov, naval officer, participated in the Great Patriotic War, was awarded the Hero of the Soviet Union for bravery
 Iskander Dautov, machine-gunner, fought in the Great Patriotic War, was posthumously awarded the Hero of the Soviet Union for bravery
 Makhmut Gareyev, author, military strategist and theoretician, participated in the Great Patriotic War and the Afghan War, served as advisor to the Presidents of Egypt and Afghanistan, served as the President of the Academy of Military Science
 Shakir Geniatullin, major general in the Red Army, fought in the Russian Civil War and the Great Patriotic War, received numerous military awards
 Tamerlan Ishmukhamedov, military pilot, participated in the Great Patriotic War, was awarded the Hero of the Soviet Union for heroism
 Anvar Kaliyev, reconnaissance officer, participated in the Great Patriotic War, was awarded the Hero of the Soviet Union for bravery
 Khamit Niyeatbakov, medical instructor, participated in the Great Patriotic War, was awarded the Hero of the Soviet Union for bravery, killed in battle
 Khabibulla Yakin – telephone operator and soldier, participated in the Great Patriotic War, was awarded the Order of Glory for bravery
 Pyotr Gavrilov – Soviet officer, a World War II-era Hero of Soviet Union
 Dmitry Karbyshev

Poets
Anna Achmatova – poet (Tatar grandmother) 
 Bella Akhmadulina – poet (Volga Tatar father)
 Gavrila Derzhavin – poet (distant Tatar ancestry)
 Musa Jalil – poet, prisoner of war during World War II
 Ghabdulla Tuqay – prominent Volga Tatar poet
Yevgeny Yevtushenko – poet (partially Tatar origin)

Politicians and public figures
Nafigulla Ashirov – mufti, president of the spiritual association of Muslims of the Asiatic part of Russia
 Aydar Akhatov
 Edkham Akbulatov
 Mikhail Tugan-Baranovsky
 Aleksander Sulkiewicz – co-founder of the Polish Socialist Party
 Rashid Nurgaliyev – former Russia`s Minister of Internal Affairs
 Elvira Nabiullina – former Russia's Minister of Economic Development and Trade
 Mintimer Shaimiev – Tatarstan's first president
 Ravil Geniatullin – governor of the Chita region (oblast) in Russia (Tatar father)
 Ravil Gainutdin – Grand Mufti of Russia
 Felix Yusupov – Russian nobleman, Rasputin's killer (Tatar ancestry)
 Janette Sadik-Khan – former Commissioner of the New York City Department of Transportation (under Mayor Michael Bloomberg)
 Aman Tuleyev – governor of Kemerovo oblast (half-Volga Tatar mother)
 Mirsaid Sultan-Galiev – Volga Tatar Bolshevik
 Marat Khusnullin – Deputy Mayor of Moscow
 Mullanur Waxitov – Revolutionary active in the Russian Revolution

Scientists and mathematicians
 Gabdulkhay Akhatov – linguist, professor
 Reşid Rahmeti Arat – professor
 Rifkat Bogdanov – mathematician
 Roald Sagdeev – nuclear physicist, former science advisor to President Gorbachev, former Director of the Russian Space Research Institute in Moscow (1973–1988)
 Edl Schamiloglu – electrical engineer and physicist
 Rashid Syunaev – astrophysicist
 Haroun Tazieff – vulcanologist and geologist (Volga Tatar father)
 Konstantin Tsiolkovsky (Volga Tatar ancestry)
 Vil Mirzayanov – chemistry scientist, known to be chased by Russia's Federal Security Service and then emigrated to USA

Sports and games persons

Chess Grandmasters 
 Alisa Galliamova
 Gata Kamsky
 Rashid Nezhmetdinov
 
 Ildar Ibragimov
 Evgeny Bareev
 Timur Gareev
 Alisa Galliamova (Volga Tatar mother)

Football (Association)
 Marat Kabaev
 Elmir Nabiullin
 Yuri Utkulbayev
 Marat Garayev
 Rinat Bilyaletdinov
 Diniyar Bilyaletdinov
 Rinat Dasayev
 Rustyam Fakhrutdinov
 Ilshat Faizulin
 Viktor Fayzulin
 Vagiz Galiullin
 Marat Izmailov
 Rustem Kalimullin
 Ruslan Mingazow
 Galimzyan Khusainov
 Vagiz Khidiatullin
 Ravil Netfullin
 Ruslan Nigmatullin
 Marat Anvaryevich Safin
 Vladislav Shayakhmetov (Tatar father)
 Renat Yanbayev (Volga Tatar father)
 Artur Rimovich Yusupov
 Rifat Zhemaletdinov
 Danil Akhatov
 Kamil Mullin
 Daler Kuzyayev
 Ravil Sabitov
 Arminas Narbekovas (Volga Tatar father)

Tennis
 Timur Khabibulin
 Rauza Islanova
 Marat Safin
 Dinara Safina
 Shamil Tarpishchev
 Kamilla Rakhimova
 Veronika Kudermetova (Volga Tatar father)

Boxing
 Ruslan Chagaev
 Danis Latypov
 Zakir Safiullin
 Oleg Saitov (Volga Tatar father)
 Nikolai Valuev (Tatar grandfather)

Gymnastics
 Galima Shugurova
 Venera Zaripova
 Amina Zaripova
 Dinara Gimatova
 Aliya Garayeva
 Aliya Yusupova
 Laysan Utiasheva (Volga Tatar ancestry)
 Alina Kabayeva (Volga Tatar father)
 Nellie Kim (Volga Tatar mother)
 Yanina Batyrchina (Volga Tatar father)
 Aliya Mustafina (Volga Tatar father)

Ice Hockey
 Denis Abdullin
 Rafael Akhmetov
 Rafael Batyrshin
 Ruslan Batyrshin
 Eduard Kudermetov
 Rushan Rafikov
 Ilshat Bilalov
 Zinetula Bilyaletdinov
 Valeri Bragin
 Ansel Galimov
 Emil Galimov
 Eduard Gimatov
 Irek Gimayev
 Ravil Gusmanov
Räshid Hakimsan (Finnish Tatar)
 Rinat Ibragimov
 Marat Kalimulin
 Nikolai Khabibulin
 Dinar Khafizullin
 Renat Mamashev
 Evgeny Muratov
Lotfi Nasib (Finnish Tatar)
 Grigory Shafigulin
 Vadim Sharifijanov
 Nail Yakupov
 Albert Yarullin
 Danis Zaripov
 Ruslan Zainullin
 Rinat Valiev
 Artyom Gareyev

Other
 Timur Safin – foil fencer
 Gulnaz Gubaydullina – modern pentathlete
 Artur Akhmatkhuzin – foil fencer
 Anvar Ibragimov – foil fencer
 Kamil Ibragimov – foil fencer (Volga Tatar father)
 Adelina Zagidullina – foil fencer
 Yuliya Garayeva – fencer
 Ilfat Abdullin – archer
 Danil Khalimov – Greco-Roman wrestler
 Dina Aspandiyarova – sports shooter
 Ildar Akhmadiev – sprinter
 Ruslan Kurbanov –  épée fencer
 Alise Fakhrutdinova – modern pentathlete
 Rishat Khaibullin – climber
 Malika Khakimova – épée fencer
 Zilia Batyrshina – sports shooter
 Veronika Vakhitova – water polo player
 Ilmir Hazetdinov – ski jumper
 Ildar Fatchullin – ski jumper
 Denis Galimzyanov – racing cyclist
 Radion Gataullin – pole vaulter
 Ildar Hafizov – wrestler
 Aigul Gareeva – racing cyclist
 Ilnur Zakarin – racing cyclist
 Gulnaz Khatuntseva – racing cyclist
 Elvira Khasanova – racewalking athlete
 Irek Rizaev – BMX rider
 Elvina Karimova – water polo player
 Yulia Karimova – sport shooter
 Vadim Mukhametyanov – sports shooter
 Alsu Minazova – slalom canoeist
 Halina Konopacka – athlete (Lipka Tatar mother)
 Svetlana Ishmouratova – biathlete
 Batu Khasikov – former professional kickboxer and politician, (Tatar mother)
 Mikhail Koklyaev – strongman, (Volga Tatar mother)
 Rinat Mardanshin
 Zemfira Meftahatdinova
 Viktor Minibaev – Olympic diver
 Farhat Mustafin – wrestler
 Rozaliya Nasretdinova – swimmer (Volga Tatar father)
 Ruslan Nurudinov – weightlifter
 Aydar Nuriev – racing driver 
 Ilgizar Safiullin – athlete 
 Gulnara Samitova – distance runner 
 Imil Sharafetdinov – wrestler 
 Emil Sayfutdinov (Volga Tatar father)
 Irina Shayk – model, (Volga Tatar paternal grandmother)
 Sariya Zakyrova – rower
 Alina Zagitova – figure skater, 2018 Olympic champion
 Kamila Valieva – figure skater, 2019 Junior Grand Prix champion, 2020 Russian junior champion
 Aleksandr Galliamov – figure skater
 Karina Safina – figure skater
 Rustam Valiullin – biathlete
 Irek Zinnurov – water polo player

Theologians
 Ravil Gainutdin
 Musa Bigiev – one of the prominent representatives of the Jadid movement
 Sergei Bulgakov (distant Tatar ancestry) 
 Gabdennasir Kursawi – Islamic reformist, innovator (Jadidist)
 Talgat Tadzhuddin
 Said Ismagilov

Writers
 Saadet Çağatay – writer and professor
 Cengiz Dağcı – writer, novelist and poet
 Näqi İsänbät – writer
 Ayaz İshaki – emigree writer, prominent member of the Turkish elite during the first half of the 20th century, one of the founders of Pan-Turkism
 Sadri Maksudi Arsal – writer, scholar, and theorist of Turkish nationalist thought
 Yusuf Akçura – writer, publicist, and theorist of Turkish nationalist thought
 Ğädel Qutuy – writer
 Abdulla Aliş – writer
 Hadi Taqtaş – writer
 Fatix Ämirxan – writer
 Näqi İsänbät – writer
 Ğäliäsğar Kamal – writer and playwright
 Tufan Miñnullin – writer and playwright
 Chingiz Aitmatov (Volga Tatar mother)

Journalists
Rina Zaripova

See also
List of Kazan khans
List of Astrakhan khans
List of Crimean khans
List of Crimean Tatars
List of Volga Bulgaria kings
Tatar name
Serving Tatars
List of Russian princely families

References

Volga Tatars
Tatars
+List